James J. Hogan (October 31, 1872 – March 20, 1910) was an Irish American football player. He was elected to the College Football Hall of Fame in 1954.

He played for the Yale Bulldogs football team from 1901 to 1904. On leaving Yale, he entered Columbia Law School and set up a practice in 1908. Two years later, Hogan died - a victim of Bright's disease.

References

1872 births
1910 deaths
All-American college football players
American football tackles
Yale Bulldogs football players
College Football Hall of Fame inductees